Dix-Huit Montagnes Region (often shorted to Montagnes Region) is a defunct region of Ivory Coast. From 1997 to 2011, it was a first-level subdivision region. The region's capital was Man and its area was 16,782 km². Since 2011, the territory formerly encompassed by the region is part of Montagnes District.

Administrative divisions and geography

When it was created in 1997, Dix-Huit Montagnes occupied the entire territory that is today Montagnes District. However, in 2000, Duékoué, Guiglo, and Toulépleu Departments were split-off from Dix-Huit Montagnes to form Moyen-Cavally Region.

At the time of its dissolution, Dix-Huit Montagnes was divided into six departments: Bangolo, Biankouma, Danané, Kouibly, Man, and Zouan-Hounien.

Dix-Huit Montagnes was traversed by a northwesterly line of equal latitude and longitude.

Abolition
Dix-Huit Montagnes was abolished as part of the 2011 administrative reorganisation of the subdivisions of Ivory Coast. The area formerly encompassed by the region is now part of Montagnes District. The territories of the departments of Biankouma, Danané, Man, and Zouan-Hounien become Tonkpi Region. The territory of the remaining departments, Bangolo and Kouibly, were combined with the former Moyen-Cavally Region's Duékoué Department to create Guémon Region.

References

Former regions of Ivory Coast
States and territories disestablished in 2011
2011 disestablishments in Ivory Coast
1997 establishments in Ivory Coast
States and territories established in 1997